This is a list of defunct airlines of Moldova.

See also
 List of airlines of Moldova
 List of airports in Moldova

References

Moldova
Airlines
Airlines, defunct